Ziaul Roshan (born 8 November 1989) (Bengali: জিয়াউল রোশান) known mononymously as Roshan, is a Bangladeshi film actor and model who appears in Bangladeshi films. His father is a politician from Bangladesh.

Career

Roshan started his career by modeling. In 2016 he made his debut in Rokto opposite Porimoni, released both in Bangladesh and India. The film was an Indo-Bangla joint production.

Dhat Teri Ki was his second film, with Farin Khan, Arifin Shuvoo and Nusraat Faria Mazhar in opposite roles.

Education
He completed his Bachelor of Business Administration (BBA) from Independent University, Bangladesh.

Filmography

Television

Music videos

References

External links
 
Ziaul Roshan Biography at Local Celebrity

Living people
People from Dhaka
Bengali male actors
Bangladeshi male film actors
Male actors in Bengali cinema
21st-century Bangladeshi male actors
People from Brahmanbaria district
1989 births